Matt Soper is a Republican, who represents Colorado House of Representatives District 54, which encompasses parts of Mesa and Delta counties on Colorado's Western Slope.

Background
Soper holds degrees from Colorado Mesa University, the University of Edinburgh School of Law, and the University of New Hampshire School of Law. He runs a research and writing business called Oxford Strategies, LLC.

Elections

2018
Soper ran unopposed in the Republican primary to replace retiring incumbent Yeulin Willett. He defeated Independent candidate Thea Chase in the general election with 66.01% of the vote.

2020
Soper ran unopposed in the Republican primary. He defeated Democratic nominee AliceMarie Slaven-Emond in the general election with 74.44% of the vote.

2022
In the 2022 Colorado House of Representatives general election, Soper defeated his Democratic Party opponent, winning 73.80% of the total votes cast.

References

External links
 Campaign website
 State House website

21st-century American politicians
Living people
Republican Party members of the Colorado House of Representatives
People from Delta County, Colorado
21st-century American businesspeople
Colorado Mesa University alumni
Alumni of the University of Edinburgh School of Law
University of New Hampshire School of Law alumni
1984 births